Max Allen Sandlin Jr. (born September 29, 1952) is a former Democratic Congressman who served eight years (1997–2005) in the U.S. House of Representatives representing Texas District 1.

Early life and career
The son of the former Margie Beth Barnett and her husband Maxwell Allen Sandlin, Max Sandlin is a graduate of Baylor University, where he was a member of Phi Delta Theta and named Outstanding Young Alumni, and Baylor University School of Law, where he was a member of the National Championship Mock Trial Team. He was the Distinguished Speaker for the John William Minton and Florence Dean Minton Endowed Law School Lecture Series at Law Day 2004 at Baylor Law School.

He practiced law in Texas and had a broad-based litigation and business practice. He was active in the banking and energy industries. He also served on the Board of Directors of East Texas Legal Services. He is a former County Judge and County Court at Law Judge.

Congress 
First elected to Congress in 1996, he rose to become a member of the senior House Democratic leadership, serving as Chief Deputy Whip. He served on the powerful and exclusive Ways and Means Committee, the Financial Services Committee, and the Transportation and Infrastructure Committee. He was an elected and later a leadership representative on the Democratic Steering and Policy Committee, and also among the small group of legislators selected for the Parliamentary Group, representatives called upon for rapid parliamentary and procedural action on the floor of the U.S. House.

Sandlin was a member of the Blue Dog Coalition and was Chairman of the Blue Dog Energy Task Force.  Additionally, he served as Chairman of the Democratic Caucus Financial Services Task Force and was a member of the New Democrat Coalition.

While in the House, Sandlin was frequently asked to present and argue policy, and the Austin American-Statesman noted "Sandlin is a forceful and articulate speaker, a lawyer by trade who treats audiences like juries that can be charmed, coaxed, inspired and won over."
The Paris Daily News noted that "Sandlin is highly polished...with God-given speaking talents" and an "...ability to communicate eloquently."

Sandlin was known as a consensus builder, and The Almanac of American Politics noted that he had a "...moderate voting record that straddles Democratic wings."
The Democratic Caucus and leadership often called upon Sandlin's coalition-building skills and U.S. Rep. George Miller (D-CA) noted "We've always looked for a way to build that bridge [between liberals and centrists]. He [Sandlin] certainly has that talent."
The Austin American-Statesman added that "Sandlin's a versatile campaigner, equally at home with Unitarians as he is in a roomful of good ol' boys."

Sandlin was a primary target of the Republican 2003 re-redistricting process orchestrated by then-House Majority Leader Tom DeLay (R-TX).  Sandlin's district was made significantly more urban and Republican than its predecessor.  Sandlin denounced the reconfiguring of his district, calling it an illegal and unconstitutional effort to dilute and eliminate the voices of rural and minority voters.  Sandlin lost to former district judge Louie Gohmert in a massive landslide, taking only 39 percent of the vote.  Three other members of the so-called "Texas Five" were also defeated after their districts were radically altered. No Democrat has garnered more than 35 percent of the vote since Sandlin left office.

Private life
Sandlin is currently a partner and co-chairman of Mercury, a public strategy firm.

Sandlin is a former youth baseball, basketball, and softball coach. He is the father of five children, has three grandchildren, and is married to former U.S. Representative Stephanie Herseth Sandlin (D-SD).

References

External links

1952 births
21st-century American politicians
Baptists from Texas
Baylor Law School alumni
County judges in Texas
Democratic Party members of the United States House of Representatives from Texas
Herseth family
Living people
People from Marshall, Texas
People from Texarkana, Arkansas
Texas state court judges
Baptists from Arkansas
Members of Congress who became lobbyists